Isaac Morgan Reeves (1822-1905) was a long serving Irish Anglican priest.

Reeves educated at Trinity College, Dublin He was ordained deacon in 1844 and priest in 1845. After a curacy in Douglas, County Cork he held incumbencies  at St John of Jerusalem, Hackney then Rosscarbery, County Cork.

References

Alumni of Trinity College Dublin
Deans of Ross, Ireland
1905 deaths
1822 births
19th-century Irish Anglican priests
20th-century Irish Anglican priests